Emmanuel Episcopal Church is a historic Episcopal 101 2nd Avenue, South Hailey, Idaho. It was started in 1885 and was added to the National Register in 1977.

See also
Hailey Methodist Episcopal Church, also National Register-listed

References

Episcopal church buildings in Idaho
Churches on the National Register of Historic Places in Idaho
Gothic Revival church buildings in Idaho
Churches completed in 1885
Churches in Blaine County, Idaho
19th-century Episcopal church buildings
National Register of Historic Places in Blaine County, Idaho
Buildings and structures in Hailey, Idaho